The 1895 Occidental football team represented Occidental College as an independent during the 1895 college football season.  The team compiled a 6–0, including a victory over USC, and outscored opponents by a total of 106 to 6. At the end of the season, the Los Angeles Athletic Club declared Occidental to be the Southern California football champion. 

Salem Wales Goodale played at the right halfback position and was the team's captain. Goodale was an Amerst College alumnus. An Occidental professor, Goodale was placed in charge of athletics at Occidental and became known as "the Walter Camp of the West."

Other key players included "Little Lewis" Murray at left end, Pedro Recio at left tackle, Will Salisbury at left guard, V. Place at center, A. L. Randall at right guard, J. Ramsaur at right tackle, Winthrop Blackstone at right end (also team manager), Bradshaw at quarterback, Will Edwards at left halfback, and Will Ramsaur at fullback.

Schedule

References

Occidental
Occidental Tigers football seasons
College football undefeated seasons
Occidental Football